Thomas Thiry (born 9 September 1997) is a French professional ice hockey Defenceman currently playing for HC Ajoie in the National League (NL). He previously played with EV Zug and SC Bern. Thiry plays with a Swiss-player license in the NL.

Playing career
Thiry made his National League debut during the 2017-18 season with EV Zug.

On November 25, 2019, Thiry signed a two-year contract with SC Bern, starting with the 2020/21 season and through the 2021/22 season.

International play
He represented France at the 2019 IIHF World Championship.

References

External links

1997 births
Living people
HC Ajoie players
SC Bern players
French expatriate ice hockey people
French expatriate sportspeople in Switzerland
French ice hockey defencemen
Sportspeople from Saint-Germain-en-Laye
EV Zug players